Neaviperla is a genus of green stoneflies in the family Chloroperlidae. There is one described species in Neaviperla, N. forcipata, found in North America. The species was formerly called Suwallia forcipata.

References

Further reading

 
 

Chloroperlidae